The 14th Airlift Squadron is a newly established airlift squadron of the Polish Air Force. The unit is stationed at the 33rd Air Base in Powidz with the 7th Tactical Squadron. The unit  operates 5 newly purchased Lockheed C-130 Hercules transport aircraft, the last being accepted in formal ceremony on 22 August 2012.

References

Squadrons of the Polish Air Force

Military units and formations established in 2006